The Department of Somaliland Immigration "(SIBC)" or Somaliland Immigration and Border Control is an agency of the government of Somaliland under the Ministry of Interior and also is the principal authority to execute and implement the immigration laws of Somaliland. The SIBC regulates examination and authorization of application for visas, entry and residence permits in Somaliland. The agency is headed by the Brigadier General. The current Brigadier General is Mohamed Osman Aalin (Dayib).

The Immigration Department is also responsible for the issue of Somaliland Passports.

Mission 
 The control of persons entering or leaving Somaliland.
 The issuance of travel documents, including Somaliland passports, to bonafide Somalilanders within and outside Somaliland.
 The issuance of residence permits to foreigners in Somaliland.
 Border surveillance and patrol.

Getting a Visa

You may need a visa to stay in Somaliland for a maximum of 90 days. People who want to enter Somaliland on a temporary visit need a visa, which meets the following requirements:

 At work or to participate in a conference
 To visit relatives and friends
 as a tourist
 Different rules apply if you want to stay longer than 90 days in Somaliland, in which case you may need a temporary residence permit
The application must be submitted to a representative office in Somaliland.

Somaliland Visa Application: Arabic, English and French

Getting a passport

Somaliland Passport can only be issued to Somaliland citizens provided that they prove their nationality.

It is given only to citizens who:
 Who has his ID card that was given to him during the elections
interval.
 Who prove that he did not commit any crime.
 Who have a document from the District Prosecution for verification

Ranks

Gallery

See also
 Ministry of Interior (Somaliland)
 Somaliland nationality law

References

External links

 

1995 establishments in Somaliland
Immigration services